Ernst Wilhelm Fiedler (1905–1960) was a German cinematographer. He also directed three films.

Selected filmography
 Gypsy Blood (1934)
 The Glass Ball (1937)
 The Marriage Swindler (1938)
 Doctor Crippen (1942)
 A Gust of Wind (1942)
 The Golden Spider (1943)
 Ulli and Marei (1948)
 The Blue Swords (1949)
 Friday the Thirteenth (1949)
 The Last Year (1951)
 Elephant Fury (1953)
 Swelling Melodies (1955)

References

Bibliography
 Giesen, Rolf. Nazi Propaganda Films: A History and Filmography. McFarland, 2003.

External links

1905 births
1960 deaths
Film people from Berlin